In mathematics, bicubic interpolation is an extension of cubic interpolation (not to be confused with cubic spline interpolation, a method of applying cubic interpolation to a data set) for interpolating data points on a two-dimensional regular grid. The interpolated surface (meaning the kernel shape, not the image) is smoother than corresponding surfaces obtained by bilinear interpolation or nearest-neighbor interpolation. Bicubic interpolation can be accomplished using either Lagrange polynomials, cubic splines, or cubic convolution algorithm.

In image processing, bicubic interpolation is often chosen over bilinear or nearest-neighbor interpolation in image resampling, when speed is not an issue. In contrast to bilinear interpolation, which only takes 4 pixels (2×2) into account, bicubic interpolation considers 16 pixels (4×4). Images resampled with bicubic interpolation can have different interpolation artifacts, depending on the b and c values chosen.

Computation

The interpolated surface can then be written as

The interpolation problem consists of determining the 16 coefficients .
Matching  with the function values yields four equations:
 
 
 
 

 
 
 
 
 
 
 
 

And four equations for the  mixed partial derivative:
 
 
 
 

The expressions above have used the following identities:

This procedure yields a surface  on the unit square  that is continuous and has continuous derivatives. Bicubic interpolation on an arbitrarily sized regular grid can then be accomplished by patching together such bicubic surfaces, ensuring that the derivatives match on the boundaries.

Grouping the unknown parameters  in a vector

and letting

the above system of equations can be reformulated into a matrix for the linear equation .

Inverting the matrix gives the more useful linear equation , where

which allows  to be calculated quickly and easily.

There can be another concise matrix form for 16 coefficients:

or

where

Extension to rectilinear grids

Often, applications call for bicubic interpolation using data on a rectilinear grid, rather than the unit square.

In this case, the most practical approach to computing the coefficients  is to let

Next, the normalized interpolating variables are computed as
,

Then, the interpolating surface becomes

Finding derivatives from function values

If the derivatives are unknown, they are typically approximated from the function values at points neighbouring the corners of the unit square, e.g. using finite differences.

To find the cross derivative , take the derivative in both axes, one at a time. (Or one can do it in the opposite direction, first calculating  and then  from those. The two give equivalent results.)

At the edges of the dataset, when one is missing some of the surrounding points, the missing points can be approximated by a number of methods. A simple and common method is to assume that the slope from the existing point to the target point continues without further change, and using this to calculate a hypothetical value for the missing point.

Bicubic convolution algorithm

Bicubic spline interpolation requires the solution of the linear system described above for each grid cell. An interpolator with similar properties can be obtained by applying a convolution with the following kernel in both dimensions:

where  is usually set to −0.5 or −0.75.

This approach was proposed by Keys, who showed that  produces third-order convergence with respect to the sampling interval of the original function.

If we use the matrix notation for the common case , we can express the equation in a more friendly manner:

Note that for 1-dimensional cubic convolution interpolation 4 sample points are required. For each inquiry two samples are located on its left and two samples on the right. These points are indexed from −1 to 2 in this text. The distance from the point indexed with 0 to the inquiry point is denoted by  here.

Use in computer graphics

The bicubic algorithm is frequently used for scaling images and video for display (see bitmap resampling). It preserves fine detail better than the common bilinear algorithm.

However, due to the negative lobes on the kernel, it causes overshoot (haloing). This can cause clipping, and is an artifact (see also ringing artifacts), but it increases acutance (apparent sharpness), and can be desirable.

See also

 Spatial anti-aliasing
 Bézier surface
 Bilinear interpolation
 Cubic Hermite spline, the one-dimensional analogue of bicubic spline
 Lanczos resampling
 Natural neighbor interpolation
 Sinc filter
 Spline interpolation
 Tricubic interpolation
 Directional Cubic Convolution Interpolation

References

External links
 Application of interpolation to elevation samples
 Interpolation theory
 Explanation and Java/C++ implementation of (bi)cubic interpolation
 Excel Worksheet Function for Bicubic Lagrange Interpolation

Image processing
Multivariate interpolation